Thot may refer to:

 Duckie Thot (born 1995), Australian model
 Nim Thot, Cambodian politician
 Thốt Nốt district, in Vietnam
 a subgroup of the fictional Breen in Star Trek
 an American slang word similar to slut

See also 
 Thoth (disambiguation)
 Thot Shit, a 2021 song